Leptobrachella kajangensis, also known  as the Kajang slender litter frog, is a species of amphibian in the family Megophryidae. It is endemic to Malaysia and only known from its type locality, a small cave near the top of Gunung Kajang (=Mount Kajang), on Tioman Island, a small island located 32 km off the east coast of Peninsular Malaysia.

Description
The type locality is a cave, and the type specimens were observed calling near the edge of a pond in the cave. Some tadpoles were collected from the same pond and assumed to represent the same species. There is also an earlier collection of tadpoles from a lower altitude on the same mountain that are morphologically similar to the ones at the type locality but that differ in colouration; they might represent another species.

Biogeography
Tioman Island was connected with Peninsular Malaysia as late as the Pleistocene. However, Grismer et al. considered it unlikely that Leptolalax kajangensis could have dispersed over flat, low-lying landscape to Gunung Kajang; instead, they suggest that the presence of this species on Tioman Island represents much older vicariance, that is, the species (or its ancestors) would have reached Tioman Island when it was still part of a larger mountainous landscape.

References

External links
Amphibian and Reptiles of Peninsular Malaysia - Leptolalax kajangensis

kajangensis
Amphibians of Malaysia
Endemic fauna of Malaysia
Amphibians described in 2004
Taxonomy articles created by Polbot
Taxa named by Larry Lee Grismer
Taxa named by Jesse L. Grismer